The Australian Broadcasting Corporation (ABC) operates four national radio networks, over 50 local radio stations, the international service ABC Radio Australia and several digital stations. Most of the stations, as well as podcasts, are available on the ABC Listen app, and ten radio stations are available via the ABC Television.

International
ABC Radio Australia

National networks
ABC Radio National – news and current affairs, arts, music, society, science, drama and comedy
Triple J – youth-targeted music, news and entertainment (since 1975)
ABC Classic – classical music, the ABC's first entirely FM radio network (since 1976)
ABC NewsRadio – parliamentary broadcasts and rolling news (since 1994)

Digital stations
Triple J Unearthed – digital-only music station for independent unsigned Australian artists
Double J – digital-only station aimed at over-30s (formerly DiG Radio, since 2002)
ABC Classic 2 – Features 100% Australian performances of classical music, streaming-only, un-presented
ABC Jazz – A digital station featuring jazz
ABC Country – A digital station featuring country, un-presented
ABC Kids Listen – Digital-only station for children
ABC Grandstand – Sports events

Local Radio
 there are 53 ABC Local Radio stations, including 45 regional stations and 8 capital city stations.

The capital city (formerly: metropolitan) stations including their callsigns are:
ABC Sydney (2BL)
ABC Melbourne (3LO)
ABC Brisbane (4QR)
ABC Adelaide (5AN)
ABC Perth (6WF)
ABC Hobart (7ZR)
ABC Canberra (2CN)
ABC Darwin (8DDD)

The regional stations are:

New South Wales
ABC Broken Hill – Broken Hill (2NB), administered by ABC South Australia
ABC Central Coast – Gosford (2BLT)
ABC Central West – Orange (2CR)
ABC Coffs Coast – Coffs Harbour
ABC Illawarra – Wollongong (2ILA)
ABC Mid North Coast – Port Macquarie (2KP)
ABC Newcastle – Newcastle (2NC)
ABC New England North West – Tamworth (2NU)
ABC North Coast – Lismore (2NNR)
ABC Riverina – Wagga Wagga (2RVR)
ABC South East NSW – Bega (2BA)
ABC Upper Hunter – Muswellbrook (2UH)
ABC Western Plains – Dubbo (2WPR)

Victoria
ABC Ballarat – Ballarat (3CRR)
ABC Central Victoria – Bendigo (3ABCRR)
ABC Gippsland – Sale (3GI) (3GLR)
ABC Goulburn Murray – Wodonga (3MRR)
ABC Mildura Swan Hill – Mildura (3MIL)
ABC Shepparton – Shepparton (3GVR)
ABC South West Victoria – Warrnambool (3WL)
ABC Western Victoria – Horsham (3WV)

Queensland
ABC Capricornia – Rockhampton (4RK)
ABC Gold Coast – Gold Coast (4ABC)
ABC Sunshine Coast – Sunshine Coast (4SCR)
ABC Far North – Cairns (4QCC)
ABC North Queensland – Townsville (4QN)
ABC North West Queensland – Mount Isa (4ISA)
ABC Southern Queensland – Toowoomba (4QS)
ABC Tropical North – Mackay (4QAA)
ABC Western Queensland – Longreach (4QL)
ABC Wide Bay – Bundaberg (4QB)

South Australia
ABC North and West SA – Port Pirie (5CK)
ABC Riverland – Renmark (5MV)
ABC South East SA – Mount Gambier (5MG)
ABC West Coast SA – Port Lincoln (5LN)

Western Australia
ABC Goldfields-Esperance – Kalgoorlie (6GF) (6ED)
ABC Great Southern – Albany (6WA)
ABC Kimberley – Broome (6BE) and Kununurra (6KW)
ABC Midwest & Wheatbelt – Geraldton (6GN)
ABC Pilbara – Karratha (6KP)
ABC South Coast – Albany (6AL)
ABC South West WA – Bunbury (6BS)

Tasmania
ABC Northern Tasmania – Launceston (7NT) and Burnie (7ABCRR)

Northern Territory
ABC Alice Springs – Alice Springs (8AL)
ABC Katherine – Katherine (8ABCRR)

See also
 History of ABC Radio (Australia)
 List of radio stations in Australia
 Timeline of Australian radio

External links

Reference

Australian Broadcasting Corporation radio stations